Wace ( 1110 – after 1174), sometimes referred to as Robert Wace, was a Medieval Norman poet, who was born in Jersey and brought up in mainland Normandy (he tells us in the Roman de Rou that he was taken as a child to Caen), ending his career as Canon of Bayeux.

Life
All that is known of Wace's life comes from autobiographical references in his poems. He neglected to mention his birthdate; some time between 1099 and 1111 is the most commonly accepted period for his birth.

The name Wace, used in Jersey until the 16th century, appears to have been his only name; surnames were not universally used at that time. It was quite a common first name in the Duchy of Normandy, derived from the Germanic personal name Wasso. The spelling and the pronunciation of this name were rendered different ways in the texts, according to the place where the copyists were from. In the various versions of the Roman de Rou, his name appears five times as Wace, then Gace (once), Vace, Vacce, Vaicce (three times all together). Until the 11th century, the w spelling corresponded to the pronunciation [w] (like in English) in Northern Normandy (including the Channel Islands), but it shifted to [v] in the 12th century. South to an isogloss corresponding more or less to the Joret line, [w] had been turned to [gw] and later [g] (like in common French). Today the name survives as the patronymic surname Vasse in Normandy and in the North of France and Gasse further south (including also Normandy).

It is speculated that he may have been of aristocratic origin, as he was sent to Caen to be educated, which would have been virtually impossible for most. His detailed writing on maritime matters may have stemmed from his island upbringing.

Around 1130 Wace returned to Caen and took ecclesiastical work, possibly as a teacher.

The date of Wace's death is uncertain.  The most recent event described in the Roman de Rou may be dated to 1174.  In the Rou, Wace also mentions Henry the Young King as living.  The latter lived until 1183, which means that Wace probably did not revise the Rou after that date.

Works
His extant works include the Roman de Brut,  a verse history of Britain, the Roman de Rou, and other works in verse, including the Lives of Margaret the Virgin and Saint Nicholas.

Roman de Brut
Roman de Brut (c. 1155) was based on the Historia Regum Britanniae of Geoffrey of Monmouth. It cannot be regarded as a history in any modern sense, although Wace often distinguishes between what he knows and what he does not know, or has been unable to find out. Wace narrates the founding of Britain by Brutus of Troy to the end of the legendary British history created by Geoffrey of Monmouth. The popularity of this work is explained by the new accessibility to a wider public of the Arthur legend in a vernacular language. In the midst of the Arthurian section of the text, Wace was the first to mention the legend of King Arthur's Round Table and the first to give the name Excalibur to Arthur's sword, although on the whole he adds only minor details to Geoffrey's text.

The Roman de Brut became the basis, in turn, for Layamon's Brut, an alliterative Middle English poem, and Peter Langtoft's Chronicle. Historian Matthew Bennett, in an article entitled "Wace and warfare," has pointed out that Wace clearly had a good understanding of contemporary warfare, and that the details of military operations he invents to flesh out his accounts of pseudo-historical conflicts can therefore be of value in understanding the generalities of warfare in Wace's own time.

Roman de Rou
His later work, the Roman de Rou, was, according to Wace, commissioned by Henry II of England. A large part of the Roman de Rou is devoted to William the Conqueror and the Norman Conquest of England. Wace's reference to oral tradition within his own family suggests that his account of the preparations for the Conquest and of the Battle of Hastings may have been reliant not only on documentary evidence but also on eyewitness testimony from close relations – though no eyewitnesses would have been still alive when he began work on the text. The Roman de Rou also includes a mention of the appearance of Halley's Comet. The relative lack of popularity of the Roman de Rou may reflect the loss of interest in the history of the Duchy of Normandy following the incorporation of continental Normandy into the kingdom of France in 1204.

Language
The Romance language Wace wrote in is variously regarded as an Old Norman dialect of the Norman language, a dialect of Old French, or specifically the precursor of Jèrriais. Writers in Jersey have looked on Wace as the founder of Jersey literature, and Jèrriais is sometimes referred to as the language of Wace although the poet himself predated the development of Jèrriais as a literary language. Wace is the earliest known Jersey writer.

Although the name Robert has been ascribed to Wace, this is a tradition resting on little evidence. It is generally believed nowadays that Wace only had one name. As a clerc lisant, he was proud of his title of Maistre (master) and is consequently sometimes referred to as Maistre Wace.

There is a granite memorial stone to Wace built into the side of the States Building in Jersey's Royal Square. This includes a quote from the Roman de Rou that expresses the poet's pride in his place of birth:

Jo di e dirai ke jo sui
Wace de l’isle de Gersui

Modern Jèrriais:
J'dis et dithai qu'jé sis
Wace dé l'Île dé Jèrri

Modern French:
Je dis et dirai que je suis
Wace de l'île de Jersey

English:
I say and will say that I am
Wace from the Island of Jersey

See also
Anglo-Norman literature

Notes

References
 
 Bratu, Cristian, « Je, auteur de ce livre »: L’affirmation de soi chez les historiens, de l’Antiquité à la fin du Moyen Âge. Later Medieval Europe Series (vol. 20). Leiden: Brill, 2019.
 Bratu, Cristian, “Translatio, autorité et affirmation de soi chez Gaimar, Wace et Benoît de Sainte-Maure.” The Medieval Chronicle 8 (2013): 135–164.
 Charles Foulon, "Wace" in Arthurian Literature in the Middle Ages, Roger S. Loomis (ed.). Clarendon Press: Oxford University. 1959. 
 Wace, Roman de Brut, ed. I. Arnold, 2 vols., Paris, 1938–1940.
 Weiss, Judith, Wace's Roman de Brut. A History of the British. Text and Translation, Exeter, 2006.
 Arnold, I., and Pelan, M., La partie arthurienne du Roman de Brut, Paris, 1962.
 Wace, Roman de Rou, ed. J. Holden, 3 vols. Paris, 1970–1973.
 Wace, Roman de Rou, ed. G. Burgess, Woodbridge, Suffolk, 2004.

External links 

 
 
 Wace, Chronicle of the Norman Conquest from Roman de Rou translated by Edgar Taylor, 1837.
 

12th-century Normans
Norman-language poets
Writers of Arthurian literature
12th-century births
12th-century deaths
Jersey writers
12th-century French poets
12th-century French writers